William Walton Butterworth (September 7, 1903 – March 31, 1975) was an American diplomat. He was United States Ambassador to Canada.

Biography
Butterworth is best known for his work on Asian-American foreign relations, particularly during the clash of the communists and nationalists in post-war China. He was also instrumental in laying the groundwork for the European Union via his work with the European Coal and Steel Community and European Economic Community.

Education
Butterworth was born in New Orleans, Orleans Parish, Louisiana, on September 7, 1903. In Mercer County, New Jersey, he attended The Lawrenceville School where he graduated in 1921. He later attended New Jersey's Princeton University, graduating in 1925. He was also a Rhodes Scholar at Oxford University in England.

Foreign Service

He entered the foreign service and began a career that encompassed 40 years of service.

His career began with a one-year stint at the State Department in Washington. From 1929 to 1931, he was the vice consul to the Embassy in Singapore. Following brief posts in Washington and Ottawa, he was assigned to the American Embassy in London, where he served as second secretary until 1941. During World War II, Butterworth was first secretary of the American Embassy in Madrid from 1942-44. Concurrently, he was in charge of operations for the United States Commercial Co. for the Iberian Peninsula, a government entity that played war games by procuring strategic war materials, including tungsten. From 1944 to 1946 he was the U.S. Embassy counselor in Madrid. From 1946 to 1947, Mr. Butterworth served as the counselor of the U.S. Embassy in Nanking, China, where he held the rank of minister and was a political advisor to George Marshall. Following his assignment in China, Butterworth returned as director for Far Eastern Affairs. He was appointed by General Marshall to be the Assistant Secretary for Far Eastern Affairs in 1950. Butterworth later served as U.S. ambassador to Sweden, U.S. representative to the European Coal and Steel Community, U.S. representative to the European Economic Community and European Atomic Energy Community. He was named a 'Career Ambassador' on March 20, 1962, one of forty-six diplomats to hold the title.

In what would be his last posting, Butterworth was appointed by President John F. Kennedy to be the 8th U.S. Ambassador to Canada on October 4, 1962; on September 10 of 1968 he would leave this posting.

Retirement
After retirement in 1968, William Walton Butterworth died on March 31, 1975 of cirrhosis of the liver. While his last residence was in Mercer County, New Jersey, he was buried at Metairie Cemetery, City of New Orleans, Orleans Parish, Louisiana.

Footnotes

1903 births
1975 deaths
Ambassadors of the United States to Canada
Ambassadors of the United States to the European Union
Ambassadors of the United States to Sweden
People from New Orleans
United States Career Ambassadors
United States Assistant Secretaries of State
Lawrenceville School alumni
Princeton University alumni
American Rhodes Scholars
United States Foreign Service personnel
20th-century American diplomats